A trolleybus (also known as trolley bus, trolley coach, trackless trolley, trackless tramin the 1910s and 1920sor trolley) is an electric bus that draws power from dual overhead wires (generally suspended from roadside posts) using spring-loaded trolley poles. Two wires, and two trolley poles, are required to complete the electrical circuit. This differs from a tram or streetcar, which normally uses the track as the return path, needing only one wire and one pole (or pantograph). They are also distinct from other kinds of electric buses, which usually rely on batteries. Power is most commonly supplied as 600-volt direct current, but there are exceptions.

Currently, around 300 trolleybus systems are in operation, in cities and towns in 43 countries. Altogether, more than 800 trolleybus systems have existed, but not more than about 400 concurrently.

History

The trolleybus dates back to 29 April 1882, when Dr. Ernst Werner Siemens demonstrated his "Elektromote" in a Berlin suburb. This experiment continued until 13 June 1882, after which there were few developments in Europe, although separate experiments were conducted in the U.S. In 1899, another vehicle which could run either on or off rails was demonstrated in Berlin. The next development was when Louis Lombard-Gérin operated an experimental line at the Paris Exhibition of 1900 after four years of trials, with a circular route around Lake Daumesnil that carried passengers. Routes followed in six places including Eberswalde and Fontainebleau. Max Schiemann on 10 July 1901 opened the world's fourth passenger-carrying trolleybus system, which operated at Bielatal (Biela Valley, near Dresden), Germany. Schiemann built and operated the Bielatal system, and is credited with developing the under-running trolley current collection system, with two horizontally parallel overhead wires and rigid trolleypoles spring-loaded to hold them up to the wires. Although this system operated only until 1904, Schiemann had developed what is now the standard trolleybus current collection system. In the early days there were many other methods of current collection. The Cédès-Stoll (Mercédès-Électrique-Stoll) system was first operated near Dresden between 1902 and 1904, and 18 systems followed. The Lloyd-Köhler or Bremen system was tried out in Bremen with 5 further installations, and the Cantono Frigerio system was used in Italy.

Throughout this period, trackless freight systems and electric canal boats were also built.

Leeds and Bradford became the first cities to put trolleybuses into service in Great Britain, on 20 June 1911. Supposedly, though it was opened on 20 June, the public was not admitted to the Bradford route until the 24th. Bradford was also the last city to operate trolleybuses in the UK; the system closed on 26 March 1972. The last rear-entrance trolleybus in service in Britain was also in Bradford and is now owned by the Bradford Trolleybus Association. Birmingham was the first UK city to replace a tram route with trolleybuses, while Wolverhampton, under the direction of Charles Owen Silvers, became world-famous for its trolleybus designs. There were 50 trolleybus systems in the UK, London's being the largest. By the time trolleybuses arrived in Britain in 1911, the Schiemann system was well established and was the most common, although the Cédès-Stoll (Mercédès-Électrique-Stoll) system was tried in West Ham (in 1912) and in Keighley (in 1913).

Smaller trackless trolley systems were built in the US early as well. The first non-experimental system was a seasonal municipal line installed near Nantasket Beach in 1904; the first year-round commercial line was built to open a hilly property to development just outside Los Angeles in 1910. The trackless trolley was often seen as an interim step, leading to streetcars. In the US, some systems subscribed to the all-four concept of using buses, trolleybuses, streetcars (trams, trolleys), and rapid transit subway and/or elevated lines (metros), as appropriate, for routes ranging from the lightly used to the heaviest trunk line. Buses and trolleybuses in particular were seen as entry systems that could later be upgraded to rail as appropriate. In a similar fashion, many cities in Britain originally viewed trolleybus routes as extensions to tram (streetcar) routes where the cost of constructing or restoring track could not be justified at the time, though this attitude changed markedly (to viewing them as outright replacements for tram routes) in the years after 1918. Trackless trolleys were the dominant form of new post-World War I electric traction, with extensive systems in among others, Los Angeles, Chicago, Rhode Island, and Atlanta; Boston, San Francisco, and Philadelphia still maintain an "all-four" fleet.
Some trolleybus lines in the United States (and in Britain, as noted above) came into existence when a trolley or tram route did not have sufficient ridership to warrant track maintenance or reconstruction. In a similar manner, a proposed tram scheme in Leeds, United Kingdom, was changed to a trolleybus scheme to cut costs.

Trolleybuses are uncommon today in North America, but their use is widespread in Europe and Russia. They remain common in many countries which were part of the Soviet Union. Generally trolleybuses occupy a position in usage between street railways (trams) and motorbuses. Worldwide, around 300 cities or metropolitan areas on 5 continents are served by trolleybuses. (Further detail under Use and preservation, below.)

This mode of transport operates in large cities, including Athens, Belgrade, Bratislava, Bucharest, Budapest, Chisinau,  Geneva, Kyiv, Lyon, Minsk, Pyongyang, Riga, Rome, San Francisco, São Paulo, Sofia, St. Petersburg, Sarajevo, Tallinn, Vilnius and Zurich, as well as in smaller ones such as Arnhem, Bergen, Coimbra, Dayton, Gdynia, Kaunas, Lausanne, Limoges, Lucerne, Modena, Plzeň, Prešov, Salzburg, Solingen, Szeged, and Yalta. As of 2020 Kyiv has, due to its history in the former Soviet Union, the largest trolleybus system in the world in terms of route length while another formerly Soviet city, Minsk, has the largest system in terms of number of routes (which also date back to the Soviet era). Landskrona has the smallest system in terms of route length while Marianske Lazne is the smallest city to be served by trolleybuses. Opened in 1914, Shanghai's trolleybus system is the oldest operating system in the world. With a length of 86 km, route #52 of Crimean Trolleybus is the longest trolleybus line in the world. See also Trolleybus usage by country.

Transit authorities in some cities have reduced or discontinued the use of trolleybuses in recent years, while others, wanting to add or expand use of zero-emission vehicles in an urban environment, have opened new systems or are planning new systems. For example, new systems opened in Lecce, Italy, in 2012; in Malatya, Turkey, in 2015; and in Marrakesh, Morocco, in 2017. Beijing and Shanghai have been expanding their respective systems, with Beijing expanding to a 31-line system operated with a fleet of over 1,250 trolleybuses. Trolleybuses have been long encouraged in North Korea with the newest city to have a network being Manpo in December 2019. Prague and Berlin are currently constructing or planning major new trolleybus systems.

Vehicle design

Modern design vehicles

Drive system

Advantages

Comparison to trams
Cheaper infrastructureThe initial start up cost of trams is much higher, due to rail, signals, and other infrastructure. Trolleybuses can pull over to the kerb like other buses, eliminating the need for special boarding stations or boarding islands in the middle of the street, thus stations can be moved as needed.
Better hill climbingTrolleybuses' rubber tyres have better adhesion than trams' steel wheels on steel rails, giving them better hill-climbing capability and braking.
Easier traffic avoidanceUnlike trams (where side tracks are often unavailable), an out-of-service vehicle can be moved to the side of the road and its trolley poles lowered. The ability to drive a substantial distance from the power wires allows trackless vehicles to avoid obstacles, although it also means a possibility that the vehicle may steer or skid far enough that the trolley pole can no longer reach the wire, stranding the vehicle. Trackless trolleys also are able to avoid collisions by manoeuvring around obstacles, similar to motor buses and other road vehicles, while streetcars can only change speed.
QuietnessTrolleybuses are generally quieter than trams.
Easier trainingThe control of trolleybuses is relatively similar to motorbuses; the potential operator pool for all buses is much larger than for trams.

Comparison to motorbuses

Disadvantages

Comparison to trams
Note: As there are numerous variations of tram and light-rail technology, the disadvantages listed may be applicable only with a specific technology or design.

Like any bus, much less capacity than trams.
More control requiredTrolleybuses must be driven like motorbuses, requiring directional control by the driver.
Higher rolling resistanceRubber-tired vehicles generally have more rolling resistance than steel wheels, which decreases energy efficiency.
Less efficient use of right-of-wayLanes must be wider for unguided buses than for streetcars, since unguided buses can drift side-to-side. The use of guidance rail allows trams running in parallel lanes to pass closer together than drivers could safely steer.
Difficulties with platform loadingImplementation of level platform loading with minimal gap, either at design stage or afterwards, is easier and cheaper to implement with rail vehicles.

Comparison to motorbuses
Difficult to re-routeWhen compared to motorbuses, trolleybuses have greater difficulties with temporary or permanent re-routings, wiring for which is not usually readily available outside of downtown areas where the buses may be re-routed via adjacent business area streets where other trolleybus routes operate. This problem was highlighted in Vancouver in July 2008, when an explosion closed several roads in the city's downtown core. Because of the closure, trolleys were forced to detour several miles off their route in order to stay on the wires, leaving major portions of their routes not in service and off-schedule.
AestheticsThe jumble of overhead wires may be seen as unsightly. Intersections often have a "webbed ceiling" appearance, due to multiple crossing and converging sets of trolley wires.
DewirementsTrolley poles sometimes come off the wire. Dewirements are relatively rare in modern systems with well-maintained overhead wires, hangers, fittings and contact shoes. Trolleybuses are equipped with special insulated pole ropes which drivers use to reconnect the trolley poles with the overhead wires. When approaching switches, trolleybuses usually must decelerate in order to avoid dewiring, and this deceleration can potentially add slightly to traffic congestion. In 1998, a dewirement in Shenyang on poorly maintained infrastructure killed 5 people and ultimately led to the destruction of the trolleybus network.
Unable to overtake other trolleybusesTrolleybuses cannot overtake one another in regular service unless two separate sets of wires with a switch are provided or the vehicles are equipped with off-wire capability, with the latter an increasingly common feature of new trolleybuses.
Higher capital cost of equipmentTrolleybuses are often long-lived equipment, with limited market demand. This generally leads to higher prices relative to internal combustion buses. The long equipment life may also complicate upgrades.
More training requiredDrivers must learn how to prevent dewiring, slowing down at turns and through switches in the overhead wire system, for example.
Overhead wires create obstructionTrolleybus systems employ overhead wires above the roads, often shared with other vehicles. The wires can restrict tall motor vehicles such as delivery trucks ("lorries") and double decker buses from using or crossing roads fitted with overhead wires, as such vehicles would hit the wires or pass dangerously close to them, risking damage and dangerous electrical faults. The wires also may impede positioning of overhead signage and create a hazard to activities such as road repairs using tall excavators or piling rigs, use of scaffolding, etc.

Off-wire power developments

With the re-introduction of hybrid designs, trolleybuses are no longer tied to overhead wires. The Public Service Company of New Jersey, with Yellow Coach, developed "All Service Vehicles;" trackless trolleys capable of operating as gas-electric buses when off wire, and used them successfully between 1935 and 1948. Since the 1980s, systems such as Muni in San Francisco, TransLink in Vancouver, and Beijing, among others, have bought trolleybuses equipped with batteries to allow them to operate fairly long distances away from the wires. Supercapacitors can be also used to move buses short distances.

Trolleybuses can optionally be equipped either with limited off-wire capability—a small diesel engine or battery pack—for auxiliary or emergency use only, or full dual-mode capability. A simple auxiliary power unit can allow a trolleybus to get around a route blockage or can reduce the amount (or complexity) of overhead wiring needed at operating garages (depots). This capability has become increasingly common in newer trolleybuses, particularly in China, North America and Europe, where the vast majority of new trolleybuses delivered since the 1990s are fitted with at least limited off-wire capability. These have gradually replaced older trolleybuses which lacked such capability. In Philadelphia, new trackless trolleys equipped with small hybrid diesel-electric power units for operating short distances off-wire were placed in service by SEPTA in 2008. This is instead of the trolleys using a conventional diesel drive train or battery-only system for their off-wire movement.

King County Metro in Seattle, Washington and the MBTA in Boston's Silver Line have used dual-mode buses that run on electric power from overhead wires on a fixed right-of-way and on diesel power on city streets. Metro used special-order articulated Breda buses, introduced in 1990, and most were retired in 2005. A limited number of the Breda dual-mode buses had their diesel engines removed, and operated exclusively as trolleybuses until 2016. Since 2004, the MBTA has used dual-mode buses on its Silver Line (Waterfront) route. These are due to be replaced by diesel hybrid and battery-electric buses by 2023.

With the development of battery technology in recent years, trolleybuses with extended off-wire capability through on-board batteries are becoming popular. The on-board battery is charged while the vehicle is in motion under the overhead wires and then allows off-wire travel for significant distances, often in excess of 15 km. Such trolleybuses are called, among others, trolleybuses with In-Motion Charging, hybrid trolleybuses, battery trolleybuses and electric buses with dynamic charging. The main advantages of this technology over conventional battery electric buses are reduced cost and weight of the battery due to its smaller size, no delays for charging at end stops as the vehicle charges while in motion and reduced need for dedicated charging stations that take up public space. This new development allows the extension of trolleybus routes or the electrification of bus routes without the need to build overhead wires along the whole length of the route. Cities that utilize such trolleybuses include Beijing, Ostrava, Shanghai, Mexico City, Saint Petersburg, and Bergen. The new trolleybus systems in Marrakesh, Baoding and Prague are based exclusively on battery trolleybuses. The city of Berlin, Germany is planning to build a new trolleybus system with 15 routes and 190 battery trolleybuses.

Other considerations

With increasing diesel fuel costs and problems caused by particulate matter and NOx emissions in cities, trolleybuses can be an attractive alternative, either as the primary transit mode or as a supplement to rapid transit and commuter rail networks.

Trolleybuses are quieter than internal combustion engine vehicles. Mainly a benefit, it also provides much less warning of a trolleybus's approach. A speaker attached to the front of the vehicle can raise the noise to a desired "safe" level. This noise can be directed to pedestrians in front of the vehicle, as opposed to motor noise which typically comes from the rear of a bus and is more noticeable to bystanders than to pedestrians.

Trolleybuses can share overhead wires and other electrical infrastructure (such as substations) with tramways. This can result in cost savings when trolleybuses are added to a transport system that already has trams, though this refers only to potential savings over the cost of installing and operating trolleybuses alone.

Wire switches

Trolleybus wire switches (called "frogs" in the UK) are used where a trolleybus line branches into two or where two lines join. A switch may be either in a "straight through" or "turnout" position; it normally remains in the "straight through" position unless it has been triggered, and reverts to it after a few seconds or after the pole shoe passes through and strikes a release lever. (In Boston, the resting or "default" position is the "leftmost" position.) Triggering is typically accomplished by a pair of contacts, one on each wire close to and before the switch assembly, which power a pair of electromagnets, one in each frog with diverging wires. ("Frog" generally refers to one fitting that guides one trolley wheel/shoe onto a desired wire or across one wire. Occasionally, "frog" has been used to refer to the entire switch assembly.)

Multiple branches may be handled by installing more than one switch assembly. For example, to provide straight-through, left-turn or right-turn branches at an intersection, one switch is installed some distance from the intersection to choose the wires over the left-turn lane, and another switch is mounted closer to or in the intersection to choose between straight through and a right turn. (This would be the arrangement in countries such as the US, where traffic directionality is right-handed; in left-handed traffic countries such as the United Kingdom and New Zealand, the first switch (before the intersection) would be used to access the right-turn lanes, and the second switch (usually in the intersection) would be for the left-turn.)

Three common types of switches exist: power-on/power-off (the picture of a switch above is of this type), Selectric, and Fahslabend.

A power-on/power-off switch is triggered if the trolleybus is drawing considerable power from the overhead wires, usually by accelerating, at the moment the poles pass over the contacts. (The contacts are lined up on the wires in this case.) If the trolleybus "coasts" through the switch, the switch will not activate. Some trolleybuses, such as those in Philadelphia and Vancouver, have a manual "power-coast" toggle switch that turns the power on or off. This allows a switch to be triggered in situations that would otherwise be impossible, such as activating a switch while braking or accelerating through a switch without activating it. One variation of the toggle switch will simulate accelerating by causing a larger power draw (through a resistance grid), but will not simulate coasting and prevent activation of the switch by cutting the power.

A Selectric switch has a similar design, but the contacts on the wires are skewed, often at a 45-degree angle, rather than being lined up. This skew means that a trolleybus going straight through will not trigger the switch, but a trolleybus making a turn will have its poles match the contacts in a matching skew (with one pole shoe ahead of the other), which will trigger the switch regardless of power draw (accelerating versus coasting).

For a Fahslabend switch, the trolleybus' turn indicator control (or a separate driver-controlled switch) causes a coded radio signal to be sent from a transmitter, often attached to a trolley pole. The receiver is attached to the switch and causes it to trigger if the correct code is received. This has the advantage that the driver does not need to be accelerating the bus (as with a power-on/power-off switch) or trying to make a sharp turn (as with a Selectric switch).

Trailing switches (where two sets of wires merge) do not require action by the operator. The frog runners are pushed into the desired position by the trolley shoe, or the frog is shaped so the shoe is guided onto the exit wire without any moving parts.

Manufacturing

Well over 200 different trolleybus makers have existed – mostly commercial manufacturers, but in some cases (particularly in communist countries), built by the publicly owned operating companies or authorities. Of the defunct or former trolleybus manufacturers, the largest producers in North America and Western Europe – ones whose production totalled more than 1,000 units each – included the U.S. companies Brill (approx. 3,250 total), Pullman-Standard (2,007), and Marmon-Herrington (1,624); the English companies AEC (approx. 1,750), British United Traction (BUT) (1,573), Leyland (1,420) and Sunbeam (1,379); France's Vétra (more than 1,750); and the Italian builders Alfa Romeo (2,044) and Fiat (approx. 1,700). The largest former trolleybus manufacture is Trolza (formerly Uritsky, or ZiU) since 1951, until they declared their bankruptcy in 2017, building over 65000 trolleybuses. Also, Canadian Car and Foundry built 1,114 trolleybuses based on designs by Brill.

As of the 2010s, at least 30 trolleybus manufacturers exist. They include companies that have been building trolleybuses for several decades, such as Škoda since 1936 and New Flyer, among others, along with several younger companies. Current trolleybus manufacturers in western and central Europe include Solaris, Van Hool and Hess, among others. In Russia ZiU/Trolza has historically been the world's largest trolleybus manufacturer, producing over 65,000 since 1951, mostly for Russia/CIS countries, but after its bankruptcy, its facilities were partially loaned out to PC Transport Systems. Škoda is Western and Central Europe's largest and the second largest in the world, having produced over 14,000 trolleybuses since 1936, mostly for export, and it also supplies trolleybus electrical equipment for other bus builders such as Solaris, SOR and Breda. In Mexico, trolleybus production ended when MASA, which had built more than 860 trolleybuses since 1979, was acquired in 1998 by Volvo. However, Dina, which is now that country's largest bus and truck manufacturer, began building trolleybuses in 2013.

Transition to low-floor designs
A significant change to trolleybus designs starting in the early 1990s was the introduction of low-floor models, which began only a few years after the first such models were introduced for motorbuses. These have gradually replaced high-floor designs, and by 2012, every existing trolleybus system in Western Europe had purchased low-floor trolleybuses, with the La Spezia (Italy) system being the last one to do so, and several systems in other parts of the world have purchased low-floor vehicles.

In the United States, some transit agencies had already begun to accommodate persons in wheelchairs by purchasing buses with wheelchair lifts, and early examples of fleets of lift-equipped trolleybuses included 109 AM General trolleybuses built for the Seattle trolleybus system in 1979 and the retrofitting of lifts in 1983 to 64 Flyer E800s in the Dayton system's fleet. The Americans with Disabilities Act of 1990 required that all new transit vehicles placed into service after 1 July 1993 be accessible to such passengers.

Trolleybuses in other countries also began to introduce better access for the disabled in the 1990s, when the first two low-floor trolleybus models were introduced in Europe, both built in 1991, a "Swisstrolley" demonstrator built by Switzerland's NAW/Hess and an N6020 demonstrator built by Neoplan. By 1995, such vehicles were also being made by several other European manufacturers, including Skoda, Breda, Ikarus and Van Hool. The first Solaris "Trollino" made its debut in early 2001. In the former Soviet Union countries, Belarus' Belkommunmash built its first low-floor trolleybus (model AKSM-333) in 1999, and other manufacturers in the former Soviet countries joined the trend in the early 2000s.

However, because the lifespan of a trolleybus is typically longer than that of a motorbus, the budget allocation and purchase typically factored in the longevity; the introduction of low-floor vehicles applied pressures on operators to retire high-floor trolleybuses that were only a few years old and replace them with low-floor trolleybuses. Responses varied, with some systems keeping their high-floor fleets, and others retiring them early but, in many instances, selling them second-hand for continued use in countries where there was a demand for low-cost second-hand trolleybuses, in particular in Romania and Bulgaria. The Lausanne system dealt with this dilemma in the 1990s by purchasing new low-floor passenger trailers to be towed by its high-floor trolleybuses, a choice later also made by Lucerne.

Outside Europe, 14 vehicles built by, and for, the Shanghai trolleybus system in mid-1999 were the first reported low-floor trolleybuses in Southeast Asia. Wellington, New Zealand, took delivery of its first low-floor trolleybus in March 2003, and by the end of 2009 had renewed its entire fleet with such vehicles. Unlike Europe, where low floor means "100%" low floor from front to back, most "low floor" buses on other continents are actually only low-entry or part-low floor.

In the Americas, the first low-floor trolleybus was a Busscar vehicle supplied to the São Paulo EMTU system in 2001. In North America, wheelchair lifts were again chosen for disabled access in new trolleybuses delivered to San Francisco in 1992–94, to Dayton in 1996–1999, and to Seattle in 2001–2002, but the first low-floor trolleybus was built in 2003, with the first of 28 Neoplan vehicles for the Boston system. Subsequently, the Vancouver system and the Philadelphia system have converted entirely to low-floor vehicles, and in 2013 the Seattle and Dayton systems both placed orders for their first low-floor trolleybuses. Outside São Paulo, almost all trolleybuses currently in service in Latin America are high-floor models built before 2000. However, in 2013, the first domestically manufactured low-floor trolleybuses were introduced in both Argentina and Mexico.

With regard to non-passenger aspects of vehicle design, the transition from high-floor to low-floor has meant that some equipment previously placed under the floor has been moved to the roof. Some transit operators have needed to modify their maintenance facilities to accommodate this change, a one-time expense.

Double-decker trolleybuses

Since the end of 1997, no double-decker trolleybuses have been in service anywhere in the world, but, in the past, several manufacturers made such vehicles. Most builders of double-deck trolleybuses were in the United Kingdom, but there were a few, usually solitary, instances of such trolleybuses being built in other countries, including in Germany by Henschel (for Hamburg); in Italy, by Lancia (for Porto, Portugal); in Russia, by the Yaroslavl motor plant (for Moscow) and in Spain, by Maquitrans (for Barcelona). British manufacturers of double-deck trolleybuses included AEC, BUT, Crossley, Guy, Leyland, Karrier, Sunbeam and others.

In 2001, Citybus (Hong Kong) converted a Dennis Dragon (#701) into a double-decker trolleybus, and it was tested on a 300-metre track in Wong Chuk Hang in that year. Hong Kong decided not to build a trolleybus system, and the testing of this prototype did not lead to any further production of vehicles.

Use and preservation

There are currently 300 cities or metropolitan areas where trolleybuses are operated, and more than 500 additional trolleybus systems have existed in the past. For an overview, by country, see Trolleybus usage by country, and for complete lists of trolleybus systems by location, with dates of opening and (where applicable) closure, see List of trolleybus systems and the related lists indexed there.

Of the systems existing as of 2012, the majority are located in Europe and Asia, including 85 in Russia and 43 in Ukraine. However, there are eight systems existing in North America and nine in South America.

Trolleybuses have been preserved in most of the countries where they have operated. The United Kingdom has the largest number of preserved trolleybuses with more than 110, while the United States has around 70. Most preserved vehicles are on static display only, but a few museums are equipped with a trolleybus line, allowing trolleybuses to operate for visitors. Museums with operational trolleybus routes include three in the UK – the Trolleybus Museum at Sandtoft, the East Anglia Transport Museum and the Black Country Living Museum – and three in the United States – the Illinois Railway Museum, the Seashore Trolley Museum and the Shore Line Trolley Museum – but operation of trolleybuses does not necessarily occur on a regular schedule of dates at these museums.

See also

 Battery electric bus
Bus rapid transit
Dual-mode bus
Electric bus
 Electric-vehicle battery
 Electromote
Guided bus
 Gyrobus
List of trolleybus manufacturers
List of trolleybus systems
 Parallel overhead lines
Traction substation
Trolleytruck

Notes

Further reading
 Bruce, Ashley R. Lombard-Gerin and Inventing the Trolleybus. (2017) Trolleybooks (UK). 
 Cheape, Charles W. Moving the masses: urban public transit in New York, Boston, and Philadelphia, 1880-1912 (Harvard University Press, 1980)
 Dunbar, Charles S. (1967). Buses, Trolleys & Trams.
 McKay, John P. Tramways and Trolleys: The Rise of Urban Mass Transport in Europe (1976)
 Murray, Alan (2000). World Trolleybus Encyclopaedia. Trolleybooks (UK). 
 Porter, Harry; and Worris, Stanley F.X. (1979). Trolleybus Bulletin No. 109: Databook II. North American Trackless Trolley Association (defunct)
 Sebree, Mac; and Ward, Paul (1973). Transit's Stepchild, The Trolley Coach (Interurbans Special 58). Los Angeles: Interurbans. LCCN 73-84356
 Sebree, Mac; and Ward, Paul (1974). The Trolley Coach in North America (Interurbans Special 59). Los Angeles: Interurbans. LCCN 74-20367

Periodicals
 Trolleybus Magazine. National Trolleybus Association (UK), bi-monthly
 Trackless, Bradford Trolleybus Association, quarterly
 Trolleybus, British Trolleybus Society (UK), monthly

External links

(in German) TrolleyMotionan international action group to promote modern trolleybus systems, and database of systems in the world
British Trolleybuses
Trolleybuses in Latin America
North American trolleybus pictures
Trolleybuses in Europe
Urban Electric Transit - Database/Photo gallery

Buses by type
 
 
Electric buses
Sustainable transport
Articles containing video clips